Su Wei (born 7 October 1982) is a Chinese long-distance runner who specialises in the marathon. His personal best time is 2:14:48 hours, achieved in March 2006 in the Xiamen Marathon.

He finished sixth at the 2006 Asian Games and 33rd at the 2007 World Championships. He also competed at the 2006 World Cross Country Championships.

Achievements

References

1982 births
Living people
Chinese male long-distance runners
Athletes (track and field) at the 2006 Asian Games
Chinese male marathon runners
Asian Games competitors for China